Natural Born Teen Top is the sixth EP recorded and performed by the South Korean idol group Teen Top. It was released digitally on June 22, 2015 and physically on June 23. The album was released in two versions and contains six tracks.

Background and release
On June 9, 2015, TOP Media announced that Teen Top will release a new mini album titled "Natural Born" on June 22. TOP Media also revealed Teen Top's first music show performance with new title track "Ah-Ah" is scheduled for June 25 on the stage of M! Countdown. On June 18, a preview video from the EP was uploaded to YouTube. The official music video for the EP's first single, "Ah-Ah", came out on June 22.

Versions
The mini-album was released in two versions, Passion and Dream, both versions having different covers, physical disc designs and photo books.

Chart performance
In Korea, Natural Born Teen Top topped local charts like Hanteo and Synnara Records from June 22 to June 28 with the Passion version of “Natural Born Teen Top” getting the top spot and the Dream version of the Album at number 2.

Natural Born Teen Top topped Gaon's Weekly Album Sales Chart in its first week. It also debuted at #13 on Billboard'''s World Albums Chart and "Ah-Ah" peaked at #20 on Billboard's'' World Digital Songs Chart.

Track listing
Credits adapted from the official homepage.

Sales and certifications

Release history

References

2015 EPs
Teen Top EPs